VTZ may refer to:

 Visakhapatnam Airport (IATA code VTZ)
 Volgograd Tractor Factory (Russian: Volgogradskiy traktornyy zavod)